Ubald J. "Bert" Noblet (March 22, 1897 – November 26, 1984) was an American college football player and coach, college ice hockey coach, and forestry professor.

Michigan Agricultural College
Noblet attended Michigan State University–then known as Michigan Agricultural College, where he starred as a halfback and quarterback on the school's football team.

Michigan Tech
Noblet began his career at Michigan Technological University in Houghton, Michigan in 1929. He served as the school's head football coach (1929–1935) and head men's ice hockey coach (1929–1937). He is also credited with starting the forestry department at Michigan Tech.

Head coaching record

References

External links
 

1897 births
1984 deaths
American football halfbacks
American football quarterbacks
Michigan State Spartans football players
Michigan Tech Huskies athletic directors
Michigan Tech Huskies football coaches
Michigan Tech Huskies men's ice hockey coaches
Michigan Technological University faculty